Age/sex/location (commonly referred to by the shorthand A/S/L, asl or ASL) is an article of Internet slang used in instant messaging programs and in Internet chatrooms. It is used as a question to find out the age, sex, and general location of the person one is talking to.

It is usually asked as a question in online romantic and sexual contexts.

Variations
 The variation A/S/L/P or ASLP are short for "Age, Sex, Location, and Picture".
 The variation NASL is short for "Name, Age, Sex, Location".
 Another variation is "Age/Sex/Location/Name/Picture" written as "A/S/L/N/P" or ASLNP.
 ASLR is short for "age, sex, location, race". ASLRP is short for "age, sex, location, race, picture".
 A/S is short for "Age/Sex".
 A/S/L/M/H is short for "Age, sex, location, music, hobbies".

Criticism

The fact that users often seek A/S/L information in "initial interactions" implies an "emphasis on the physical body online". 52% of the MOO character descriptions referenced age, sex, location, or physical appearance.

References 

Internet slang